Artti Aigro (born 29 August 1999) is an Estonian ski jumper. He competed in two events at the 2018 Winter Olympics. He also represented Estonia at the 2022 Winter Olympics.

World Cup

Standings

Individual starts (47)

References

External links 
 
 
 

1999 births
Living people
People from Otepää
Estonian male ski jumpers
Olympic ski jumpers of Estonia
Ski jumpers at the 2016 Winter Youth Olympics
Ski jumpers at the 2018 Winter Olympics
Ski jumpers at the 2022 Winter Olympics